Le Roy Crummer (c. 1871 – January 2, 1934) was an expert on heart disease.  He attended Michigan University and Northwestern University, and was a member of the Royal Society of Medicine.  In World War I he was a captain in the US Army Medical Corps.  He became Professor of the History of Medicine, first at the University of California and later at the University of Southern California.  He was associate editor of the journal Annals of Medical History.

Works
 Clinical Features of Heart Disease

References

American cardiologists
1871 births
American medical historians
1934 deaths